Sean Gregory May (born April 4, 1984) is an American former professional basketball player and current assistant basketball coach at the University of North Carolina. May was born in Chicago, Illinois and grew up in Bloomington, Indiana. He was a three-time all-state selection at Bloomington High School North, and was at one time a teammate of former NBA player Jared Jeffries. May was named to the 2002 McDonald's High School All-American team. He played in the 2002 McDonald's game with Raymond Felton and Rashad McCants, who would later team with May to win an NCAA Championship as part of the 2004–05 North Carolina Tar Heels.

College career
May is currently an assistant coach at UNC. He previously served as director of basketball operations at the school.

When the heavily recruited May chose to attend the University of North Carolina at Chapel Hill, it was a major surprise to most basketball recruiting observers; it had been thought that he would stay in his hometown and play for the Indiana University Hoosiers. He had strong family connections to IU; his father Scott was a forward on the school's undefeated 1975–76 NCAA championship team and won the Naismith Award the same year, and his brother Scott Jr. played for the Indiana basketball team that made the NCAA title game in 2002.

At North Carolina, May made his mark as the starting center for the Tar Heels basketball team from 2003 to 2005. As a junior, he was named Most Outstanding Player of the 2005 NCAA tournament after leading North Carolina to its fourth national championship. The Tar Heels defeated the University of Illinois by a score of 75–70 to win the title, with May scoring 26 points on 10–11 shooting and grabbing 10 rebounds.  May and his father are one of four father-son duos to each win an NCAA basketball championship. May graduated from the University of North Carolina in August 2009 with a B.A. in African-American studies.

Professional career

Charlotte Bobcats (2005–2009)
In April 2005, May declared that he would forgo his senior year at UNC to enter the NBA draft. He was selected 13th overall by the Charlotte Bobcats, becoming one of a record four Tar Heels to be lottery picks in the 2005 NBA draft. He started his professional career strongly by being named MVP of the Rocky Mountain Revue summer league. An injury in December, however, cut his rookie season short.

On October 5, 2007, May announced that he had decided to have micro fracture surgery on his right knee, consequently missing the entire 2007–08 NBA season. The effects of the surgery affected him the following season (2008–09), as he experienced conditioning problems, tiredness and tendinitis.

On December 30, 2008, May was deemed physically unfit to play, making Bobcats coach Larry Brown place him on the inactive list for the foreseeable future.

On June 23, 2009, ESPN News reported that the Charlotte Bobcats declined to make a qualifying offer for the fourth year of his rookie contract, making him an unrestricted free agent.

Sacramento Kings (2009–2010)
On July 21, 2009, May signed a one-year contract for $884,881 with the Sacramento Kings contingent upon him passing his physical.

On August 9, 2010, he signed a one-year contract with the New Jersey Nets. However, he suffered a stress fracture to his left foot in preseason training and was released on September 7.

International (2010–2014)
On November 22, 2010, May signed with Fenerbahçe Ülker of Turkey for the 2010–11 season.

On October 1, 2011, he signed with KK Zagreb of Croatia. In February 2012, he left Zagreb and moved to Italy to sign with Sutor Basket Montegranaro. In April 2012, he got injured and missed the rest of the season.

On July 18, 2012, May signed a two-year deal with Paris-Levallois Basket of France. This reunited May with his former college teammate Jawad Williams. In the 2013–14 season, he played only one game because of injury.

On November 24, 2014, May signed with SPO Rouen Basket. On December 30, 2014, he left Rouen and signed with Orléans Loiret Basket for the rest of the season.

Career statistics

NBA

|-
| align="left" | 
| align="left" | Charlotte
| 23 || 1 || 17.3 || .409 || .000 || .766 || 4.7 || 1.0 || .7 || .5 || 8.2
|-
| align="left" | 
| align="left" | Charlotte
| 35 || 8 || 23.9 || .500 || .667 || .768 || 6.7 || 1.9 || .5 || .7 || 11.9
|-
| align="left" | 
| align="left" | Charlotte
| 24 || 12 || 12.5 || .398 || 1.000 || .700 || 2.9 || .4 || .2 || .2 || 3.9
|-
| align="left" | 
| align="left" | Sacramento
| 37 || 4 || 8.9 || .459 || .000 || .656 || 1.9 || .5 || .3 || .2 || 3.3
|-
|  align="center" colspan=2 | Career
| 119 || 25 || 15.7 || .458 || .231 || .746 || 4.0 || 1.0 || .4 || .4 || 6.9

EuroLeague

|-
| style="text-align:left;"| 2010–11
| style="text-align:left;"| Fenerbahçe Ülker
| 8 || 0 || 12.2 || .406 || .000 || .727 || 2.8 || .5 || .5 || .3 || 4.3 || 4.1
|-
| style="text-align:left;"| 2011–12
| style="text-align:left;"| Zagreb
| 9 || 8 || 29.2 || .455 || .333 || .692 || 6.4 || 1.1 || .6 || .3 || 11.7 || 11.3
|- class="sortbottom"
|  align="center" colspan=2 | Career
| 17 || 8 || 21.2 || .442 || .292 || .703 || 4.7 || .8 || .5 || .3 || 8.1 || 7.9

College statistics

|-
| style="text-align:left;"| 2002–03
| style="text-align:left;"| North Carolina
| 11 || 10 || 28.0 || .472 || .000 || .575 || 8.1 || 1.0 || 1.5 || 1.8 || 11.4
|-
| style="text-align:left;"| 2003–04
| style="text-align:left;"| North Carolina
| 29 || 29 || 28.9 || .463 || .000 || .689 || 9.8 || 1.4 || 1.4 || 1.2 || 15.2
|-
| style="text-align:left;"| 2004–05
| style="text-align:left;"| North Carolina
| 37 || 36 || 26.8 || .567 || .000 || .758 || 10.7 || 1.7 || 1.2 || 1.0 || 17.5
|- class="sortbottom"
| style="text-align:center;" colspan="2"| Career
| 77 || 75 || 27.8 || .513 || .000 || .717 || 10.0 || 1.5 || 1.3 || 1.2 || 15.8

Back to North Carolina

In fall of 2015, May was hired as the director of player development at his alma mater, the University of North Carolina. He served in the position for two years, and thereafter transitioned to the role of Director of Basketball Operations in fall of 2017.

In April 2021, head coach Roy Williams retired and was replaced by Hubert Davis. On April 15, May received a promotion from the Director of Basketball Operations position, moving into one of the three on-the-bench assistant spots for Davis' inaugural UNC staff.

Notes

References

External links

North Carolina Tar Heels bio
FIBA.com profile
Euroleague.net profile

1984 births
Living people
African-American basketball players
All-American college men's basketball players
American expatriate basketball people in Croatia
American expatriate basketball people in France
American expatriate basketball people in Italy
American expatriate basketball people in Turkey
American men's basketball players
Basketball players from Chicago
Basketball players from Indiana
Charlotte Bobcats draft picks
Charlotte Bobcats players
Fenerbahçe men's basketball players
KK Zagreb players
McDonald's High School All-Americans
Metropolitans 92 players
North Carolina Tar Heels men's basketball coaches
North Carolina Tar Heels men's basketball players
Orléans Loiret Basket players
Parade High School All-Americans (boys' basketball)
Power forwards (basketball)
Sacramento Kings players
Sportspeople from Bloomington, Indiana
Sutor Basket Montegranaro players
21st-century African-American sportspeople
20th-century African-American people